Lamledra is a house near Gorran Haven in Cornwall, England, UK. It is situated immediately above Vault Beach. It was built in 1911 by the barrister, John Fischer Williams, and extended in the 1920s. It was formerly the residence of the Oxford academics Herbert and Jenifer Hart.

References

Houses in Cornwall